Jesper Alasaari (born December 27, 1995) is a Swedish ice hockey defenceman currently signed to Danish Metal Ligaen side Herlev Eagles. He had most recently played with UK Elite Ice Hockey League (EIHL) side Guildford Flames.

Alasaari made his Swedish Hockey League debut playing with Färjestad BK during the 2014–15 SHL season.

References

External links

1995 births
Färjestad BK players
Guildford Flames players
BIK Karlskoga players
Kristianstads IK players
IF Sundsvall Hockey players
Tingsryds AIF players
Living people
Swedish ice hockey defencemen
People from Karlskoga Municipality
Sportspeople from Örebro County